Siemionow is a Polish surname. Notable people with the surname include:

Maria Siemionow (born 1950), Polish transplant surgeon and scientist
Romuald Siemionow (1949–2008), Polish sports shooter

Polish-language surnames